Margaret ‘Peggy’ Griffin is a former camogie player, captain of the All Ireland Camogie Championship winning team in 1942 and 1943. She won two further All Ireland senior medals in 1937 and 1938 but missed the 1938 final through injury.

References

External links
 Camogie.ie Official Camogie Association Website

Dublin camogie players
Year of birth missing
Possibly living people